Criminal tattoos are a type of tattoos associated with criminals to show gang membership and record the wearer's personal history—such as their skills, specialties, accomplishments, incarceration, world view and/or means of personal expression. Tattoos are strongly empirically associated with deviance, personality disorders, and criminality.

Certain tattoo designs have developed recognized coded meanings. The code systems can be quite complex, and because of the nature of what they encode, the designs of criminal tattoos are not widely recognized as such to outsiders.

Criminal tattoos by country

Australia

Prisoners who were transported from Britain to Australian penal colonies between 1787 and 1867 were sometimes tattooed with marks intended to signify disgrace, for example, D for deserter.  Prisoners often modified these tattoos to conceal the original design or to express wry or rebellious messages.
A common prison tattoo in Australia is 'A.C.A.C.' - the initials to a derogatory phrase regarding cops.

France
In France, five dots tattoo resembling the dots on a dice, placed on the hand between index finger and thumb are found on prison inmates. This tattoo represents the individual between the four walls of the prison cell (un homme entre quatre murs—a man between four walls); this also has the same meaning in Russia and Spain.

Tattoos of three dots on the hand mean "death to cops" (mort aux vaches / flics / poulets / keufs).

A single dot on the cheek usually means the wearer is a pimp (point des maquereaux).

A stick figure holding a trident is also a common French prison tattoo.

Italy

"La Stidda," a Mafia-style criminal organization in Sicily, is known for using star tattoos to identify members.

Japan
During the Edo period of Japan, kyōkaku, urban "chivalrous commoners" or "street knights" typically wore irezumi, prominent full-body tattoos. Kyōkaku operated as cultural outlaw figures and were frequently used as characters in Japanese kabuki performances.
Current yakuza have full-body tattoos, typically inked in secret by tattoo artists associated with clans. Due to a clear association between tattoo artistry and crime, the practice was shortly banned following the Meiji restoration. During the US occupation after WWII, this law was repealed. Modern yakuza tattoos, with common symbols and visual motifs, are noted for their similarity to current Western tattoo styles.

Issey Miyake, a Japanese influential fashion director, has taken inspiration from Japanese prison tattoo culture to design wearable fashion similar to irezumi, "creating a jumpsuit with a tattoo motif that looked literally like a wearable second skin...".

Russia

Russian criminal tattoos have a complex system of symbols that can give quite detailed information about the wearer. Not only do the symbols carry meaning, but the area of the body on which they are placed may be meaningful too. The initiation tattoo of a new gang member is usually placed on the chest and may incorporate a rose. A rose on the chest is also used within the Russian mafia. Wearing false or unearned tattoos is punishable in the criminal underworld, usually by removal of the tattoo, followed by beatings and sometimes rape, or even murder. Tattoos can be removed (voluntarily, in the case of loss of rank, new affiliation, "lifestyle" change, etc.) by bandaging magnesium powder onto the surface of the skin, which dissolves the skin bearing the marks with painful caustic burns. This powder is gained by filing "light alloy," e.g., lawnmower casing and is a jailhouse commodity.

"As Russia's leading expert on tattoo iconography, Mr. Arkady Bronnikov can tell the prisoner's story from looking at the designs on his body. The huge spider in a web that is drawn on his skull reveals, in prison tattoo code, that he is a drug addict. Also, he is a repeat offender: The onion domes of a Russian church fan across his shoulder blades, each of the seven domes representing a different stay in prison. Above the church, across the back of his neck, the convict has stenciled, in Russian, "Not just anyone can hold his head this high."... "The more tattoos a convict gets, the more sentences he has served, the more respect he gets in prison," says Mr. Bronnikov. "The tattoos show that he isn't afraid of pain."

Tattoos made in a Russian prison often have a distinct bluish color (due to being made with ink from a ballpoint pen) and usually appear somewhat blurred because of the lack of instruments to draw fine lines. The ink is often created from burning the heel of a shoe and mixing the soot with urine, and injected into the skin utilizing a sharpened guitar string attached to an electric shaver.

"In [Russian] prison, the ink for tattoos was manufactured from molten rubber mixed with water and sugar. Artists used sewing needles sharpened on concrete cell floors. Sometimes, portraits of Stalin and Lenin--with or without horns--were in fashion, sometimes monasteries and medieval knights. Occasionally, caricatures of Communists with pig snouts or correctional officers in wolf guise were the rage. Maps of the gulag system, with Russia, portrayed as a giant prison camp, might be etched across someone's back. Crucifixion scenes were popular. Ronald Reagan was even a subject, according to a Russian dictionary of prison slang (Fenya)."

In addition to voluntary tattooing, tattoos are used to stigmatize and punish individuals within the criminal society. These tattoos may be placed on an individual who fails to pay debts in card games, or otherwise breaks the criminal code, and often have very blatant sexual images, embarrassing the wearer. Tattoos on the forehead are sometimes forcibly applied, and designed both to humiliate the bearer and warn others about him or her. They frequently consist of slurs about the bearer's ethnicity, sexual orientation, or perceived cooperation with the prison authorities. They can indicate that the holder is a member of a political group considered offensive by other prisoners (e.g., Vlasovite), or has been convicted of a crime (such as child rape) that is disapproved of by other criminals. They can also advertise that the bearer is "downcast", or of the lowest social caste in prison, usually used for the sexual gratification of higher-ranked inmates. Voluntary facial tattoos signify that the bearer does not expect to be released back into normal society within his lifetime, and will usually consist of tattoos on the eyelids of messages such as "Don't Wake Me Up." They are managed by inserting a metal spoon under the eyelid, so the tattoo needle does not pierce the eye.

Tattoos that consist of political or anti-authoritarian statements are known as "grins". They are often tattooed on the stomach of a thief in law, as a means of acquiring status in the criminal community. A Russian criminologist, Yuri Dubyagin, has claimed that, during the Soviet era, there existed "secret orders" that an anti-government tattoo must be "destroyed surgically", and that this procedure was usually fatal.  Tattoos of the portraits of Soviet leaders like Lenin and Stalin were often applied on the chest due to a belief that firing squads were forbidden to shoot at the leaders' pictures.

N. Banerjee wrote in 1992 for The Wall Street Journal about tattoos in Russian prisons: 
"...the pain does deter even the most macho convict from covering his body, all at once, with meaningful pictures. Tattoos are created by instilling pigment in the skin with thousands of needle pricks. In the camps, the process can take anywhere from a few hours to a few years, depending on the artist and his ambition, says Mr. Bronnikov. Because of prison conditions, tattoo artists have to improvise with materials and equipment. For instance, they will draw a picture on a wooden plank, place needles along the lines of the design, cover the needles with ink and stamp the whole tableau on the prisoner's body. Another method is to slice the image onto the skin with a razor and daub the cut with indelible ink. Usually, prisoners manage to get an electric shaver and a syringe with a needle, which they jury-rig into a tattooing machine. Ink is hard to come by, so to make dye, artists will often burn the heel of a shoe, and mix the ash with the prisoner's urine -- a practice convicts believe reduces the chance of infection."

Common body tattoos and their significance (these tattoos are most characteristic of the Old Regime when the Vory V Zakone was more structured in prisons):
243 in a badge: signifies the wearer has committed battery on a police officer. Often worn on the arm or hand used for the assault. Taken from the California penal code.
Barbed wire across the forehead signifies a sentence of life imprisonment without a possibility of parole. Barbed wire on the forearms or around the wrist signifies years served.
Bells indicate a sentence served in full. 
Birds over the horizon: "I was born free and should be free." Bearer longs for a life outside prison.
Cat: a career as a thief. A single cat means the bearer worked alone; several cats mean the bearer was part of a gang. The word "cat," in Russian, forms an acronym indicating the wearer's natural home is in prison. Alternately, can signify cleverness.
Celtic Cross: Part of the racist white power movement. It has also been used to represent crosshairs of a gun, meaning that a wearer is a hitman, and he too will meet a violent end one day.
Churches, mosques, fortresses, etc., are often tattooed on the chest, back, or hand.  The number of spires or towers can represent the years a prisoner has been incarcerated or the number of times he has been imprisoned. A cross at the top of the spire indicates that the sentence was paid in full. The phrase, "The Church is the House of God," often inscribed beneath a cathedral, has the metaphorical meaning, "Prison is the Home of the Thief."
 Cross: A small cross either on the forehead, finger, or between the thumb and forefinger is sometimes seen on convicts as a symbol of serving time in prison. There is another category of tattoos—of rings on the fingers and symbols on the hands—which informs other inmates of the bearer's rank when the bearer is clothed: A cross on the chest can represent a high ranking in the Russian mob.
Crosses on knuckles: 'Trips to the zone'. 'I've been in prison three times'.
Devil's head: 'Grin'. 'I hold a grudge against the authorities'.
Dots on knuckles: number of years served in prison.
Epaulets: Military badge and uniform are worn on the shoulders. This symbolizes criminal accomplishments. When a skull symbol is portrayed with it, it usually designates a man as a murderer. Epaulets are decorated with certain crests and symbols in the sections where one can see the skull there before conviction, especially when it was of any significance.
Five dots: Represents time done in prison. Four of the dots represent walls, while the fifth represents the prisoner.
Madonna and baby Jesus indicates that the bearer is 'clean before his friends' in that he will never betray them to authorities.  May also symbolize having become a criminal early in life.
Mermaid: indicates a conviction of child molestation
MIR: The Russian word for "peace," an acronym that indicates "only a firing squad will reform me."
Dagger in neck: Signifies that the bearer has killed and is available for hire to kill other prisoners.
Executioner: Murderer, or that they follow the Thieves' Code
Goat: Informer, an animal without honor.  Probably begrudged as a mark of humiliation.
Lenin, Stalin, Karl Marx, and Friedrich Engels: Usually tattooed across the chest or over vital organs. Mostly characteristic of the Old Regime; prisoners would tattoo them because it was believed the firing squads could not shoot the images of USSR's founding fathers.
Spider or spider web: may symbolize racism or doing time in prison
Spider Web: If the spider is in the center, the bearer is dedicated to a life of crime; if it is climbing out of the web, the bearer is trying to reform himself. A few other versions are that the wearer is a drug addict, like an insect trapped in a spider's web, he is trapped in some narcotic web, or that it signifies a time in prison as each ring of the spider web represents one year in prison.
Teardrop tattoo: A teardrop underneath an eye: the wearer was raped in prison and tattooed with a teardrop under the eye by the offending party, this was a way of "marking" an inmate as property or to publicly humiliate the inmate as face tattoos cannot be hidden. In West Coast gang culture, the tattoo may signify that the wearer has killed someone.
Tombstones represent the loss of time.  You may see the number of years that are served (i.e., five tombstones reading 2001–2005 means the prisoner has done five years).
SS: two sig runes were the symbol of the Schutzstaffel, Nazi insignia, and used by the racist white power movement.
Stars: Worn on the knees: signifies that an owner 'will kneel before no man'.
Stars: Worn on the shoulders: Signifies that the owner is a man of discipline, status, and tradition. Men will also receive stars when promoted to "Captain" in the Vory V Zakone.
Swastika: This is seen on Neo-Nazis as it is the symbol of the Nazi party. 
Single dot: 'I escaped'.
SLON: an acronym that spells the Russian word for elephant but which stands for, 'From my early years nothing but misery'.

United States
Common tattoos are names of relatives or gang members, symbols of aggression, tattoos advertising a particular skill, or religious imagery. One of the most well-known criminal tattoos is the teardrop tattoo.

A common tattoo in American prisons for Hispanic inmates, is four dots or three dots. The dots represent that you have earned your keep in your gang. The three dots would represent the 13 of the southern gangs and the same for the northern gangs with
four dots :: for 14.

Markers of the Aryan Brotherhood, a white Neo-Nazi prison gang include but are not limited to: the letters AB, Celtic imagery, and the number 666.

Prisoner tattoos

Since tattooing in prison is illegal in many jurisdictions, the inmates do not have the proper equipment necessary for the practice. This forces inmates to find ways to create their own tattooing devices out of their belongings. Improvised tattooing equipment has been assembled from materials such as mechanical pencils, magnets, radio transistors, staples, paper clips, or guitar strings.

Tattoos for enslaved prostitutes
Forced and enslaved prostitutes are often tattooed or branded with a mark of their pimps. Women and girls being forced into prostitution against their will may have their pimps' name or gang symbol inked or branded with a hot iron on their skin. In some organizations involved with the trafficking of women and girls, like the mafias, nearly all prostitutes are marked. Some pimps and organizations use their name or well-known logo, while others use secret signs.
In the past, the branding mark was usually small, sometimes hidden between the labia minora. Today some pimps write their names in big letters all upon the body of the victim.

See also

Barrio Azteca
18th Street Gang
Drug cartel
Gang signal
Human branding
HWDP, Polish anti-Police acronym
List of Chinese criminal organizations
List of criminal enterprises, gangs and syndicates
MS-13
Organized crime
Russian mafia
Tong (organization)
Triad (underground society)
Yakuza
Aryan Brotherhood

References

Citations

Other sources
Russian Criminal Tattoo Encyclopedia Volume I Danzig Baldaev, 
Russian Criminal Tattoo Encyclopedia Volume II Danzig Baldaev, 
Russian Criminal Tattoo Encyclopedia Volume III Danzig Baldaev, 
Russian Prison Tattoos: Codes of Authority, Domination and Struggle Alix Lambert,

Further reading
 By, N. B. (1992, Jul 29). Russian convicts use body language of their very own --- prison tattoos spell out lives of crime and establish the hierarchy of inmates. Wall Street Journal. 
 Glover, S. (1997, Oct 18). A marked man from tattoo to taps; violence: Out of jail and 35, Robert Torres was ready for a fresh start, but a gang insignia betrayed him. Los Angeles Times.
 Lina Goldberg, Gang Tattoos: Signs of Belonging and the Transience of Signs
 Hiatt, F. (1993, Aug 23). Gulag no longer, but still the lower depths; for many of the 1 million Russian prisoners, life inside is `Equal to torture'. The Washington Post (Pre-1997 Fulltext).
 Top tattoos, 
 Williams, D. (2000, May 29). Russia journal; prison gave an artist career in the skin trade. The Washington Post.
 Wahlstedt, E. (2010). "Tattoos and criminality: a study on the origins and uses of tattoos in criminal subcultures"

Gangs
Secret societies related to organized crime
Tattooing traditions